Najafqulu Khan I (1696–1748) was the first khan of the Tabriz Khanate from 1747 to 1784.

References

Afsharid dynasty
1748 deaths
1696 births
People from Tabriz
Tabriz Khanate
Assassinated people